Samuel Chandler Crafts (October 6, 1768November 19, 1853) was a United States representative, Senator and the 12th governor of Vermont.

Early life
Born in Woodstock in the Colony of Connecticut, Crafts graduated from Harvard College in 1790  and moved to Vermont with his parents Mehitible Chandler (sister of the painter Winthrop Chandler), and Ebenezer Crafts, who founded the town of Craftsbury by settling there in 1791. He married Eunice Todd Beardsley and the couple had two children.

Career
Crafts was town clerk from 1799 to 1829 and was a delegate to the Vermont Constitutional convention in 1793 where he was the youngest member.  He was a member of the Vermont House of Representatives in 1796, 1800–1803, and 1805, and was clerk of the house in 1798–1799. He was register of probate from 1796 to 1815 and was assistant judge of the Orleans County Court from 1800 to 1810 and 1825 to 1828.

Crafts made an extensive botanical reconnaissance of the Mississippi Valley in 1802. He was a member of the State Council of Censors from 1809 to 1813. This Council consisted of twelve men and shared executive power with the Governor. He was Chief Judge of the Orleans County Court from 1810 to 1816. Crafts was elected to the Fifteenth and to the three succeeding Congresses, serving from March 4, 1817 to March 3, 1825. He again served as a member of the governor's council in 1825 and 1826.

Crafts was Governor of Vermont from 1828 to 1831. When he was a member of the Vermont constitutional convention of 1829, he served as its president. Crafts was clerk of Orleans County from 1836 to 1839.  In 1842 he was appointed to the U.S. Senate seat vacated by the resignation of Samuel Prentiss. On October 26, 1842 he was elected to complete the remainder of Prentiss's term.  Crafts served in the Senate from April 23, 1842 to March 3, 1843. He was not a candidate for a full term, and was succeeded by William Upham.

Death
Samuel Crafts retired to his farm in Craftsbury where he died in 1853. He is interred at North Craftsbury Cemetery, North Craftsbury.

References

External links

National Governors Association

1768 births
1853 deaths
People from Woodstock, Connecticut
Vermont Whigs
19th-century American politicians
Governors of Vermont
United States senators from Vermont
Members of the Vermont House of Representatives
Vermont state court judges
Leicester Academy alumni
Harvard College alumni
Vermont National Republicans
Whig Party United States senators
People from Craftsbury, Vermont
Burials in Vermont
Democratic-Republican Party members of the United States House of Representatives from Vermont
National Republican Party state governors of the United States